Barracuda is a 1988 Australian TV film.

References

External links

Australian drama television films
1988 television films
1988 films
Films scored by Chris Neal (songwriter)
1980s English-language films